This is a list of Ghanaian novelists, including writers born in Ghana (formerly the Gold Coast) and those associated with the country.

A
 P. A. K. Aboagye (1925–2001)
 Ama Ata Aidoo (born 1940)
 Ayi Kwei Armah (born 1939)
 Ayesha Harruna Attah (born 1983)
 Nana Oforiatta Ayim
 Kofi Awoonor (1935–2013)

B
 Yaba Badoe (born 1955)
 Elizabeth-Irene Baitie (born 1970)
 Kofi Batsa (born 1931)
 J. Benibengor Blay (1915– )
 William Boyd (born 1952)
 Roseanne A. Brown (born 1995) 
 Akosua Busia (born 1966)

C
 Jojo Cobbinah (born 1948)

D
 Meri Nana-Ama Danquah (born 1967)
 Amma Darko (born 1956)
 Lawrence Darmani (born 1956)
 Kwame Dawes (born 1962)
 Amu Djoleto (born 1929)
 Michael Donkor (born 1985)
 Cameron Duodu (born 1937)

K

 Asare Konadu (1932–1994)
 Benjamin Kwakye (born 1967)

L
 B. Kojo Laing (born 1946)
 Lesley Lokko

O
 Nana Oforiatta Ayim

P
 Nii Ayikwei Parkes (born 1974)

Q
 Kwei Quartey

S
 Kobina Sekyi (1892–1956)
 Taiye Selasi (born 1979)
 Francis Selormey (1927–1988)
Nana Sandy Achampong (born 1964)

See also
 List of Ghanaian writers

Ghanaian